Tiri Toa is a Cook Island former professional rugby league footballer who played as a er in the 2000s. He played at representative level for Cook Islands.

International honours
Tiri Toa won a cap for Cook Islands in the 2000 Rugby League World Cup.

References

External links
El Magic spoils Cook's broth

Cook Islands national rugby league team players
Cook Island rugby league players
Place of birth missing (living people)
Year of birth missing (living people)
Living people
Rugby league wingers